John Harris is an Irish psycholinguist and Emeritus Professor of Psycholinguistics at Trinity College Dublin. He is known for his works on early language development.
In 2008, He was elected to Fellowship of Trinity College Dublin.
He is the editor of a  special  issue  of  the  International  Journal  of  Bilingual  Education  and  Bilingualism and Executive Editor of Language, Culture and Curriculum.

Books
 Early language development: Implications for clinical and educational practice. Harris John. London: Routledge, 1990.

References

External links
John Harris

Linguists from Ireland
Living people
Fellows of Trinity College Dublin
Academics of Trinity College Dublin
Psycholinguists
Year of birth missing (living people)